Tribune 24/7 (previously Express 24/7) was an English language television news channel headquartered in Karachi, Pakistan. The channel was owned by the Lakson Group.

History 
Tribune 24/7 was the second English-language television channel to be established in Pakistan, with Dawn News being the first. After Dawn News shifted to Urdu broadcasts in February 2010, Express 24/7 remained the only 24-hour English-language news channel in Pakistan until its closure in November 2011. The Express 24/7 CEO, Sultan Lakhani, cited the dismal economic condition and insufficient number of advertisement as the main reasons behind the closure. 
Express 24/7 was relaunched as Tribune 24/7 in 2018, before closing again in 2019.

See also
 Express News
 List of television stations in Pakistan

References

24-hour television news channels in Pakistan
Television channels and stations established in 2018
English-language television stations in Pakistan
2018 establishments in Pakistan
Television stations in Karachi
Lakson Group
2019 disestablishments in Pakistan